Virginia Credit Union LIVE! at Richmond Raceway is a 6,000-seat outdoor concert venue located in Richmond, Virginia, United States. It is adjacent to the Richmond Raceway.

History
Prior to the opening of the amphitheater in 1991, the Richmond area had seen a major decline in major music acts at its indoor arena, Richmond Coliseum. When the amphitheater opened, seasons were packed with A-list music acts that Richmond had not seen in several years. For the first few years of its operation, the summer concert series was titled the "Budweiser Concert Series," sponsored by Budweiser. Since many summer concert tours were mounted solely for outdoor venues, Richmond was the only Virginia stop on the tour of many artists on their summer itineraries, making it a destination venue for people from all over the state. When the larger outdoor venues in Manassas and Virginia Beach were built, starting in 1995, with substantially larger capacities, the Classic Amphitheater noticed a steady decline in the quality of shows promoters were able to book there. Although it was still able to secure several A-list acts each season, more and more acts were again skipping Richmond for the larger venues. In its last official season, in 1999, only one act was booked that summer -- Hootie & the Blowfish. After that season, the promoter pulled out of the venue and the owners were not able to attract the interest of any other promoters.  During the summer of 2013, the venue resumed presenting summer concerts.

Though seen as state-of-the-art at the time of its opening, in comparison to similar contemporary amphitheaters, the Classic Amphitheater had several downfalls. Sales and consumption of alcohol was restricted to a gated-off area, away from the seating; no alcohol could be taken into the seating areas. Though it had several corporate sponsorships, the venue did not have formal box-seating or suites for its sponsors—a major component of contemporary amphitheaters. The lawn seating area was smaller than the fixed seating area—at most contemporary amphitheaters, the festival lawn seating is often twice the size (or larger) of the fixed seating.

On November 28, 2016, Richmond Raceway and AEG Live announced an exclusive booking agreement for The Classic Amphitheater for the 2017 season.

On June 27, 2017, Richmond Raceway and AEG Live announced a 10-year booking agreement for the amphitheater.

On February 7, 2018, Richmond Raceway and Virginia Credit Union announced a multi-year naming rights agreement for the outdoor venue.

Events

See also
List of contemporary amphitheatres

References

Amphitheaters in the United States
Music venues in Virginia
Buildings and structures in Richmond, Virginia